This article is a list of biological species, subspecies, and evolutionary significant units that are known to have become extinct during the Holocene, the current geologic epoch, ordered by their known or approximate date of disappearance from oldest to most recent.

The Holocene is considered to have started with the Holocene glacial retreat around 11650 years Before Present ( BC). It is characterized by a general trend towards global warming, the expansion of anatomically modern humans (Homo sapiens) to all emerged land masses, the appearance of agriculture and animal husbandry, and a reduction in global biodiversity. The latter, dubbed the sixth mass extinction in Earth history, is largely attributed to increased human population and activity, and may have started already during the preceding Pleistocene epoch with the demise of the Pleistocene megafauna.

The following list is incomplete by necessity, since the majority of extinctions are thought to be undocumented, and for many others there isn't a definitive, widely accepted last, or most recent record. According to the species-area theory, the present rate of extinction may be up to 140,000 species per year.

10th millennium BC

9th millennium BC

8th millennium BC

7th millennium BC

6th millennium BC

5th millennium BC

4th millennium BC

3rd millennium BC

2nd millennium BC

1st millennium BC

1st millennium CE

1st–5th centuries

6th–10th centuries

2nd millennium CE

11th-12th century

13th-14th century

15th-16th century

17th century

18th century

19th century

1800s-1820s

1830s-1840s

1850s-1860s

1870s

1880s

1890s

20th century

1900s

1910s

1920s

1930s

1940s

1950s

1960s

1970s

1980s

1990s

3rd millennium CE

21st century

2000s

2010s

See also
List of extinct animals
Extinction event
Quaternary extinction event
Holocene extinction
Timeline of the evolutionary history of life
Timeline of environmental history
Index of environmental articles
List of environmental issues

References

Biology timelines
 Timeline of
Paleontology lists